The Mars general circulation model (MGCM) is the result of a research project by NASA to understand the nature of the general circulation of the atmosphere of Mars, how that circulation is driven and how it affects the climate of Mars in the long term.

How it works 
Mars climate simulation models date as far back as the Viking missions to Mars. Most Mars climate simulation models were written by individual researchers that were never reused or open-sourced. By the 1990s the need for a unified model codebase came into being, due to the general impact of the internet on climate modelling and research. This current Mars climate simulation model has its origins with the internet era.

This Mars climate model is a complex 3-dimensional (height, latitude, longitude) model, which represents the processes of atmospheric heating by gases and ground-air heat transfer, as well as large-scale atmospheric motions.

The current model has not been modified for use with distributed computing systems like BOINC.

Methane on Mars 

The Martian atmosphere contains 10 nmol/mol methane (CH4). In 2014, NASA reported that the Curiosity rover detected a tenfold increase ('spike') in methane in the atmosphere around it in late 2013 and early 2014. Four measurements taken over two months in this period averaged 7.2 ppb, implying that Mars is episodically producing or releasing methane from an unknown source. Before and after that, readings averaged around one-tenth that level. On 7 June 2018, NASA announced a cyclical seasonal variation in the background level of atmospheric methane.

The principal candidates for the origin of Mars' methane include non-biological processes such as water-rock reactions, radiolysis of water, and pyrite formation, all of which produce H2 that could then generate methane and other hydrocarbons via Fischer–Tropsch synthesis with CO and CO2. It has also been shown that methane could be produced by a process involving water, carbon dioxide, and the mineral olivine, which is known to be common on Mars.

Living microorganisms, such as methanogens, are another possible source, but no evidence for the presence of such organisms has been found on Mars.

Other planets 
There are global climate simulation models that have been written for Jupiter, Saturn, Neptune and Venus.

See also
Atmosphere of Mars
Climate of Mars
Global climate model
Methane

References

Climate of Mars
Mars
Numerical climate and weather models